Valenciennes (also , , ; ;  or) is a commune in the Nord department, Hauts-de-France, France.

It lies on the Scheldt river. Although the city and region experienced a steady population decline between 1975 and 1990, it has since rebounded. The 1999 census recorded that the population of the commune of Valenciennes was 41,278, and that of the metropolitan area was 39,677.

History

Before 1500
Valenciennes is first mentioned in 693 in a legal document written by Clovis II (Valentiana). In the 843 Treaty of Verdun, it was made a neutral city between Neustria and the Austrasia. Later in the 9th century the region was overrun by the Normans, and in 881 the town passed to them.  In 923 it passed to the Duchy of Lower Lotharingia dependent on the Holy Roman Empire. Once the Empire of the Franks was established, the city began to develop, though the archaeological record has still not revealed all it has to reveal about this period. Under the Ottonian emperors, Valenciennes became the centre of marches on the border of the Empire.

In 1008, a terrible famine brought the Plague. According to the local tradition, the Virgin Mary held a cordon around the city which, miraculously, has since protected its people from the disease. Since then, every year at that time, the Valenciennois used to walk around the  road round the town, in what is called the tour of the Holy Cordon. Many counts succeeded, first as Margraves of Valenciennes and from 1070 as counts of Hainaut.

In 1259 Valenciennes was the site of a General Chapter of the Dominican Order at which Thomas Aquinas together with masters Bonushomo Britto, Florentius, Albert, and Peter took part in establishing a ratio studiorum or program of studies for the Dominican Order that featured the study of philosophy as an innovation for those not sufficiently trained to study theology.  This innovation initiated the tradition of Dominican scholastic philosophy put into practice, for example, in 1265 at the Order's studium provinciale at the convent of Santa Sabina in Rome, out of which would develop the Pontifical University of Saint Thomas Aquinas, Angelicum.

In 1285, the currency of Hainaut was replaced by the currency of France: the French écu. Valenciennes was full of activity, with numerous corporations, and outside its walls a large number of convents developed, like that of the Dominicans (whose church was excavated by the Valenciennes Archaeological Service in 1989 and 1990).

In the 14th century, the Tower of Dodenne was built by Albert of Bavaria, where even today, the bell is rung in honour of Our Lady of the Holy Cordon. In the 15th century, the County of Hainault, of which Valenciennes is part, was re-attached to Burgundy, losing its autonomy. Valenciennes in this period, however, had several famous sons – the chronicler Georges Chastellain, the poet Jean Molinet, the miniaturist Simon Marmion, the sculptor Pierre du Préau and the goldsmith Jérôme de Moyenneville).

1500–1793

In 1524, Charles V, Holy Roman Emperor, arrived at Valenciennes, and – even when Henry II of France allied with him against the Protestants in 1552 – Valenciennes became (c. 1560) an early center of Calvinism and in 1562 was location of the first act of resistance against persecution of Protestants in the Spanish Netherlands. On the "Journée des Mals Brûlés" (Bad Burnings Day) in 1562, a mob freed some Protestants condemned to die at the stake.  In the wave of iconoclastic attacks called the Beeldenstorm that swept the Habsburg Netherlands in the summer of 1566, the city was the furthest south to see such an attack on August 24, 1566. It was also one of the first to feel the hand of repression after the siege and fall of the city on March 23, 1567. One of the victims of that repression was Guido de Bres, the author of the Belgic Confession. Following the "révolte des gueux's victory at Brielle, the army of Louis of Nassau, one of the major commanders of the Dutch rebel forces and supported by the Huguenot leader Gaspard de Coligny, invaded the Spanish Netherlands with an army composed of German, English, Scottish and French soldiers, and took Valenciennes on 21 May 1572. However, Louis went on to Mons, and the 
Protestant garrison left behind offered only a feeble defence to the Duke of Alba, at the head of the bulk of the Spanish army, who recaptured Valenciennes in early June 1572, depriving Louis' French allies, of one of their main bases.

In 1576, when for a time the Southern Netherlands joined the revolt, the Spanish forces massed at the porte d'Anzin (in a fortress known as "La Redoute") were besieged by Valenciennes. However, in 1580, Alexander Farnese, Duke of Parma took Valenciennes and Protestantism was eradicated there. Hereafter, Valenciennes remained under Spanish protection, no longer directly involved in later fighting of the Eighty Years' War. With its manufacturers of wool and fine linens, the city was able to become economically independent.

In 1591, the Jesuits built a school and then the foundations of a church of Sainte-Croix. In 1611, the façade of the town hall was completely rebuilt in magnificent Renaissance style. In the seventeenth century the Scheldt was channelled between Cambrai and Valenciennes, benefitting Valenciennes' wool, fabric and fine arts. To use up flax yarn, women began to make the famous Valenciennes lace.

The French army laid siege to the city in 1656 (Vauban participated in this siege without a command).  Defending the city, Albert de Merode, marquis de Trélon was injured during a sortie on horseback, died as a result of his injuries and was buried in the Church of St. Paul (his tomb was found during the archaeological campaign in 1990). The Spanish victory in the Battle of Valenciennes (16 July 1656) lifted the French siege.

In 1677, the armies of Louis XIV of France (this time led by Vauban) captured the city and in 1678 the Treaty of Nijmegen gave the French control of Valenciennes (1678) and the surrounding southern part of Hainault, roughly cutting the former county in half.  The city became one of the main strongholds of northern France, and was fortified by Vauban, who personally visited the town for that purpose shortly after the Treaty.

During the Enlightenment era, the economic situation of Valenciennes was in decline until the discovery of coal. The first pit was dug in Fresnes in 1718 and the discovery of burnable coal in 1734 at the porte d'Anzin led to the formation of the Compagnie des mines d'Anzin. In the eighteenth century, the city was equally renowned for its porcelain – indeed, it was the porcelain furnaces' demand for coal that led to the mining enterprises. Despite their quality of production, the company failed to be sustainable. Valenciennes, rich in artistic talent, became known as the Athens of the North (i.e. North of France), underlining its artistic influence.

1793–1914
The city was besieged by the First Coalition against Revolutionary France in 1793. Following a protracted Siege of Valenciennes the city was captured and occupied in July by Anglo-Austrian forces under the Duke of York and the Prince of Saxe-Coburg, and only retaken by the French Revolutionary armies in August 1794. In July 1795, one year after the execution of Robespierre put an end to the Reign of Terror, the Republicans of Valenciennes tortured, and guillotined five Ursuline nuns; by some accounts, the nuns were raped before being executed. After the Napoleonic era, Valenciennes gave itself up to the Bourbons in 1815 for 5 years. After that, the town's sugar-refining and coal industries once more started to expand.

In 1824 Valenciennes became a sous-préfecture. In the 19th century, thanks to coal, Valenciennes became a great industrial centre and the capital of Northern France's steel industry.

On 6 August 1890, a law downgraded the town's fortified status, and so from 1891 to 1893, its fortifications were demolished. The town was granted the Légion d'honneur in 1900.

First World War
During World War I the German army occupied the town in 1914. They were finally driven out by British forces at the Battle of Valenciennes in 1918, 'in which seven British divisions attacked eleven German divisions'. One dramatic first-hand experience of this battle is provided by A. S. Bullock who fought at a section of the front near Maresches.

A significant personality of this period was Louise de Bettignies (born in Saint-Amand-les-Eaux), a pupil of the Ursulines in Valenciennes from 1890 to 1896. Arrested at the end of September 1915, and imprisoned in Germany, she died of mistreatment in September 1918 two months before the Armistice. It is estimated that she saved the lives of nearly a thousand British soldiers by the remarkably precise information she obtained. For example, it enabled the British to conduct the first aerial bombing of a train (that of Kaiser Wilhelm II, who came to visit the front at Lille), though both aircraft were not equipped with suitable viewfinders and so the raid narrowly missed its target. The German High Command, based in Brussels, then put all its efforts into neutralising the accursed network that allowed the British to see everything and know everything about this part of the front. Louise's arrest was associated with the escape of Szeck Alexandre, a young Austrian radio operator who got out of Brussels in August 1915, allowing the British to get their hands on the secret German diplomatic code. This code was exploited by Secret Service Room 40 ("Room 40"), under the supervision of Sir Reginald Hall, and in January 1917 allowed the decipherment of the famous Zimmermann Telegram, which triggered the United States' entry into the war in April 1917.

Valenciennes was retaken after bitter fighting in 1918, by British and Canadian troops (one of whose soldiers, a recipient of the Victoria Cross Sergeant Hugh Cairns, was honoured in 1936 when the city named an avenue after him). Canada named a mountain, Valenciennes Mountain, after the town in 1920.

Second World War
On May 10, 1940, the town's inhabitants fled by road and it was abandoned to looters from the French army. A huge fire devoured the heart of the town, fuelled in particular by a fuel depot. German troops then occupied the ruined city on May 27. Former Prince Wilhelm was wounded in Valenciennes and later died of his wounds.

On September 2, 1944, after bloody fighting, American troops entered Valenciennes and liberated the city.

1945 to present
The town's first antenna was set up in Lille in 1964, then the Centre universitaire was set up in 1970, becoming independent in 1979 as the University of Valenciennes and Hainaut-Cambrésis.

In 2005, a local resident, Isabelle Dinoire, became the first person to have a partial face transplant.

Geography

Climate

Valenciennes has a oceanic climate (Köppen climate classification Cfb).

Population

Main sights

The Hindenburg Line ran through Valenciennes during World War I, leading to extensive destruction. Valenciennes was again almost completely destroyed during World War II, and has since been rebuilt in concrete.

A few surviving monuments are: 1) The façade of the town hall, which managed to survive the bombardments of the war; 2) Notre-Dame du Saint-Cordon, to which there is an annual pilgrimage; 3) La Maison Espagnole, the remains of the Spanish occupation, which ended in 1678. The building is now used as the town's tourist information office; 4) The Dodenne Tower, the remaining part of the medieval fortifications after Charles V ordered them reduced; 5) Théâtre le Phenix, a theatre and performing arts venue constructed in 1998; 6) The "Beffroi", a large, pin-like monument  in height, built in 2007 on the site of the former belfry.

Economy
Valenciennes is historically renowned for its lace. Until the 1970s, the main industries were steel and textiles. Since their decline, reconversion attempts focus mainly on automobile production. In 2001, Toyota built its Western European assembly line for the Toyota Yaris in Onnaing near Valenciennes. Because of this and other changes, the average unemployment in the region is now below the national average.

On 15 July 2004 the Administrative Board of the European Union's Railway Agency held its first meeting in Phénix, with representatives of the 25 Member States and François Lamoureux, those days Director General for Energy and Transportation at the European Commission. Valenciennes was picked as the European Railway Agency headquarters in December 2003. International conferences are held in Lille.

Public transport

Line No. 1 of the Tramway de Valenciennes was put into service on 3 July 2006.  long, this tramway crosses the five communes in the Valenciennois Metropolitan area, at a cost of 242.75 million Euros.

Valenciennes railway station offers connections with Lille, Paris and several regional destinations.

Administration
Valenciennes is a subprefecture of the Nord département.

Mayors since 1947
1947–1988: Pierre Carous, resigned (died in 1990)
1988–1989: Olivier Marlière
1989–2002: Jean-Louis Borloo, resigned when he entered the national government
2002–2012: Dominique Riquet 
2012–present: Laurent Degallaix

Culture 
Jean-Baptiste Carpeaux (1827 – 1875), sculptor, painter and tutor.
Louis Cattiaux (1904-1953), philosopher, painter and poet, was born in Valenciennes.
Alphonse Chigot (1824-1917), historical painter, soldier and art tutor, particularly associated with the city of Valenciennes.
Gustave Crauck (1827 - 1905), sculptor and painter
Eugène Chigot  (1860-1923), post impressionist painter and official painter for the Marine Nationale.
Henri Harpignies (1819 - 1916), painter and watercolourist.
Fabrice Jaumont, author, educator, advocate for dual-language bilingual education.
Joseph Layraud (1834 - 1912), painter and tutor.
Auguste Désiré Saint-Quentin (1838 - 1906), painter
Jean-Antoine Watteau (1684-1721), French painter, was born in Valenciennes.

Sport

Valenciennes FC is based in the city.

Twin towns – sister cities

Valenciennes is twinned with:
 Agrigento, Italy
 Central AO (Moscow), Russia
 Düren, Germany
 Gliwice, Poland
 Medway, England, United Kingdom
 Yichang, China

See also
Vendémiaire Pavot Sculptor of La Faunesse in Valenciennes

References

External links

 
Discover Valenciennes: in French
Follow real-time news from Valenciennes on the famous social network Twitter : in French
Nordmag History of Valenciennes
Fortifications of Valenciennes
Valenciennes by night, City of Culture in 2007 (pics)

 
Communes of Nord (French department)
Subprefectures in France